The 2021 Città di Como Challenger was a professional tennis tournament played on clay courts. It was the fifteenth edition of the tournament which was part of the 2021 ATP Challenger Tour. It took place in Como, Italy between 30 August and 5 September 2021.

Singles main-draw entrants

Seeds

 1 Rankings are as of 23 August 2021.

Other entrants
The following players received wildcards into the singles main draw:
  Flavio Cobolli
  Francesco Forti
  Federico Iannaccone

The following players received entry into the singles main draw using protected rankings:
  Andrea Arnaboldi
  Julien Cagnina
  Julian Lenz

The following players received entry into the singles main draw as special exempts:
  Nino Serdarušić
  Camilo Ugo Carabelli

The following players received entry into the singles main draw as alternates:
  Evan Furness
  Giulio Zeppieri

The following players received entry from the qualifying draw:
  Petros Chrysochos
  Alexander Erler
  Lucas Miedler
  Andrea Vavassori

The following players received entry as lucky losers:
  Franco Agamenone
  Alexey Vatutin

Champions

Singles

  Juan Manuel Cerúndolo def.  Gian Marco Moroni 7–5, 7–6(9–7).

Doubles

  Rafael Matos /  Felipe Meligeni Alves def.  Luis David Martínez /  Andrea Vavassori 6–7(2–7), 6–4, [10–6].

References

Città di Como Challenger
2021
2021 in Italian sport
August 2021 sports events in Italy
September 2021 sports events in Italy